Affie Ellis (née Burnside; born  1979/1980) is an American politician who serves in the Wyoming Senate from the 8th district as a member of the Republican Party. She is a member of the Navajo Nation and is the first Native American to serve in the Wyoming Senate.

Early life

Affie Burnside was born to Jim and Lenoa Burnside, both of whom were born on the Navajo Reservation. She married Dennis Ellis, with whom she had three children.

She graduated from Jackson Hole High School. From 1996 to 2000, Ellis attended the University of Wyoming and graduated with a Bachelor of Science in political science and American Indian studies. From 2004 to 2007, she attended the University of Colorado Law School and graduated with a Juris Doctor.

Career

From 2000 to 2004, Ellis worked as a legislative aid to Senator Craig L. Thomas and was in charge of Indian, public lands, and housing issues. On January 6, 2004, Ellis was appointed to serve as Director of Congressional and Public Affairs for the National Indian Gaming Commission. In 2010, she was appointed by Senate Majority Leader Mitch McConnell to serve on the Tribal Law and Order Commission after being recommended by Senator John Barrasso.

Wyoming Senate

In 2016, she ran with the Republican nomination for the Wyoming Senate in the 8th district and defeated incumbent Democratic Senator Floyd Esquibel. She is the first Native American and member of the Navajo Nation to serve in the Wyoming Senate.

During Ellis' tenure in the Wyoming Senate she has served on the Revenue committee. During the 2018 Wyoming gubernatorial election she endorsed Sam Galeotos during the Republican primary.

Electoral history

References

External links
 Affie Ellis at Ballotpedia
 
 Affie Ellis campaign website

21st-century American politicians
21st-century American women politicians
21st-century American lawyers
21st-century American women lawyers
Living people
Native American state legislators
Native American women in politics
Navajo people
People from Jackson Hole, Wyoming
Politicians from Cheyenne, Wyoming
University of Colorado alumni
University of Wyoming alumni
Women state legislators in Wyoming
Wyoming lawyers
Republican Party Wyoming state senators
Year of birth missing (living people)
21st-century Native Americans
21st-century Native American women